When Evil Wakes is an anthology of fantasy and horror stories edited by American writer August Derleth.  It was first published by Souvenir in 1963.

Contents

 "The Eye and the Finger", by Donald Wandrei
 "The Feasting Dead", by John Metcalfe
 "Death Waters", by Frank Belknap Long
 "An Invitation to the Hunt", by George Hitchcock
 "The Tsanta in the Parlour", by Stephen Grendon
 "Moonlight-Starlight", by Virginia Layefiky
 "The Kite", by Carl Jacobi
 "Sweets to the Sweet", by Robert Bloch
 "A Thin Gentlemen With Gloves, by Simon West
 "The Horror at Red Hook", by H. P. Lovecraft
 "The Triumph of Death", by H. Russell Wakefield
 "The Lips", by Henry S. Whitehead
 "A Piece of Linoleum", by David H. Keller
 "The Seed From the Sepulchre", by Clark Ashton Smith
 "Canavan's Back Yard", by Joseph Payne Brennan
 "The Shuttered Room", by H. P. Lovecraft & August Derleth

Sources

1963 anthologies
Fantasy anthologies
Horror anthologies
Souvenir Press books